WCFY-LP (99.1 FM) is a radio station  broadcasting a Christian contemporary radio format. Licensed to Evansville, Indiana, United States, the station serves the Evansville area.  The station is currently owned by Christian Fellowship Church Inc.

The station originally broadcast on 102.7 FM, but was allowed to change frequencies in early 2009 due to interference from nearby low-power stations broadcasting on 102.7 FM. The license for this frequency change was not issued by the FCC until October 14, 2014.

References

External links
 

CFY-LP
CFY-LP
Radio stations established in 2005
CFY-LP